According to Bede, Sæward was the joint king of the Kingdom of Essex from 616? to 623? along with his brothers (named as Sexred and possibly Saexbald)  after the death of their father Sæbert.  Their father converted to Christianity in 604. 
After his death they repressed the Christian religion in favour of the indigenous English religion, allowing the worship of their people's native gods. They banished Mellitus, Bishop of London, from the kingdom after he refused them the sacramental bread.
In 623(?) Sexred, Sæward and their brother were killed in a battle against the forces of Wessex. It is uncertain whether Sigeberht, son of Sæward, was their successor Sigeberht the Little or the latter's successor Sigeberht the Good.

References

617 deaths
Sexred of Essex
Anglo-Saxons killed in battle
7th-century English monarchs
Year of birth unknown
Anglo-Saxon pagans
Monarchs killed in action